Eric Hänni (born 19 December 1938) is a retired Swiss judoka who competed between 1959 and 1974. In 1964 he won an Olympic silver medal and a European bronze medal in the lightweight category. During his career Hänni won seven individual national titles (1959, 1962, 1964, 1965, 1969–71) and took part in twelve European and three world championships.

His parents divorced before he was ten, and Hänni's lived with his uncle in Bern. He then moved to Canton of Jura where he worked as a mechanic. Besides competing in judo, he also acted as a referee, at the national (since 1965), European (since 1974) and world level (since 1985). In 1966 he started coaching judo, first in Zurich and between 1967 and 1972 at Nippon Bern. In 1972 he opened his own judo club in his native Delémont, which he ran until 1995. In parallel, he trained the national junior and senior teams and acted as vice-president of the Swiss Judo Association. In 2014, he became the first Swiss judoka to receive an honorary 9th dan.

Hänni is married and has two children. He is a fan motorcycle racing, in which he competed at the national level.

References

1938 births
Living people
Swiss male judoka
Olympic judoka of Switzerland
Judoka at the 1964 Summer Olympics
Olympic silver medalists for Switzerland
Olympic medalists in judo
Medalists at the 1964 Summer Olympics
Judo referees
People from Delémont
Sportspeople from the canton of Jura
20th-century Swiss people
21st-century Swiss people